Barbara Bender is an anthropologist and archaeologist. She is currently Emeritus Professor of Heritage Anthropology at University College London.

Career 
Bender studied for a PhD on the Neolithic of Northern France at the Institute of Archaeology, London. From 1967-68 she was assistant professor at the University of Illinois, Chicago. In 1972 Bender was a Lecturer in the Department of Extra-Mural Studies of London University. Her first monograph Farming in Prehistory, published in 1975, was described as a 'painstaking compilation' of archaeological evidence on the development of agriculture.

Later she moved to the Department of Anthropology, UCL, being one of several material-culture focused anthropologists within the department in the late 1970s and early 1980s alongside Daniel Miller and John Gledhill. Bender's later work utilised a phenomenological approach to landscape, collaborating with Sue Hamilton and Christopher Tilley.  In the late 1990s, Bender, Hamilton and Tilley developed a landscape research project, with the support of UCL students, that focused on the Bronze Age settlement and stone circle at Leskernick on Bodmin Moor.  Bender's study of Stonehenge is considered a seminal work in considering archaeological sites as historically dynamic, with numerous stakeholders.

Selected publications 
Bender, B. and Phillips, P. 1972. The early farmers of France. Antiquity 46(182): 97-105.
Bender, B. 1975. Farming in Prehistory - from Hunter-Gatherer to Food Producer. London: John Baker.
Goodall, V.M. and Bender, B. 1975. The Quest for Man. London: Phaidon.
Bender, B. 1978. Gatherer‐hunter to farmer: A social perspective. World Archaeology 10(2): 204-222.
Bender, B. 1985. Emergent tribal formations in the American Midcontinent. American Antiquity 50 (1): 52-62.
Bender, B. 1986. The Archaeology of Brittany, Normandy, and the Channel Islands. London: Faber and Faber.
Gledhill, J., Bender, B., and Larsen, M.T. 1988. State and Society: the Emergence and Development of Social Hierarchy and Political Centralization. London: Unwin Hyman.
Bender, B. 1989. towards a theory of social evolution - on State systems and ideological shells. In Miller, D., Rowlands, M.J. and Tilley, C.Y. Domination and Resistance. London: Unwin Hyman.
Bender, B. 1992. Theorising Landscapes, and the Prehistoric Landscapes of Stonehenge. Man, 27(4), new series, 735-755. doi:10.2307/2804172
Bender, B. and Edmonds, M. 1992. Stonehenge: whose past? What past? Tourism Management 13(4): 355-357.
Bender, B. 1993 (ed.) Landscape: Politics and Perspectives. Oxford: Berg. 
Bender, B, Hamilton, S., and Tilley, C. 1997. Leskernick: Stone worlds, alternative narratives, nested landscapes. Proceedings of the Prehistoric Society 63: 147-178.
Bender, B. 1998. Stonehenge: Making Space. Oxford: Berg.
Hamilton, S., Tilley, C. and Bender, B. 1999. Bronze Age stone worlds of Bodmin Moor: excavating Leskernick. Archaeology International 3: 13–17.
Bender, B. 2000. ‘Investigating Landscape and Identity in the Neolithic’, in A. Ritchie (ed.) Neolithic Orkney in its European Context, pp. 223–230. Cambridge: McDonald Institute Monographs.
Bender, B. 2001. Landscapes on-the-move. Journal of Social Anthropology 1(1): 75-89.
Bender, B. and Winer, M. (eds) 2001. Contested Landscapes: Movement, Exile and Place. Oxford: Berg.
Bender, B. 2002. Time and landscape. Current Anthropology 43: S103-S112.
Tilley, C., Hamilton, S., Bender, B. 2003. Art and re-presentation of the past. Journal of the Royal Anthropological Institute 6(1): 35-62. 
Hamilton, S., Harrison, S., and Bender, B. 2008. "Conflicting Imaginations: Archaeology, Anthropology and Geomorphology on Leskernick Hill, Bodmin Moor, Southwest Britain." Geoforum 39 (2): 602-15. 
Bender, B., Hamilton, S., and Tilley, C.  2016. Stone Worlds: Narrative and Reflexivity in Landscape Archaeology. London: Routledge.

References

External links 

 The Leskernick Project

American women anthropologists
American women archaeologists
Year of birth missing (living people)
Living people
21st-century American women